Orestias is a genus of orchids. It has 4 known species, all native to central Africa, including the island of São Tomé in the Gulf of Guinea.

Orestias elegans Ridl. - São Tomé, Príncipe
Orestias foliosa Summerh. in G.M.D.Troupin - Gabon, Zaire
Orestias micrantha Summerh. - São Tomé, Cameroon, Equatorial Guinea
Orestias stelidostachya (Rchb.f.) Summerh. - São Tomé

References

Orchids of Africa
Malaxideae genera
Malaxidinae